Hellanicus or Hellanikos may refer to:

 Hellanicus of Lesbos (5th century BC), Greek logographer
 Hellanicus (grammarian) (3rd century BC), Greek grammarian; see Chorizontes
 Hellanicus (mythology), one of the suitors of Penelope
 Hellanicus of Miletus, ancient Greek historian